Chigny may refer to:

Chigny, Aisne, a commune in France
Chigny, Switzerland, a municipality in the canton of Vaud

See also
Chigny-les-Roses, in the Marne department, France